Attitogon  or Atitogan is a canton and village in the Lacs Prefecture in the Maritime Region of south-eastern Togo.

External links

Populated places in Maritime Region
Cantons of Togo